UCS, or Uniform Communication Standard, is used by the grocery and retail-oriented industries for electronic transactions. It is a subset of the X12 national standard consisting of some 300-plus general-purpose EDI messages. Within that large base set, many verticals are built on a small subset with narrow focus.

Usage
While starting in the grocery side of business, current users of UCS include:

 manufacturers
 retailers
 wholesalers
 brokers
 beverage (alcohol)
 convenience stores
 food service industries
 wholesale drug
 mass merchandising
 service merchandising
 public warehousing

History
In the 1960s, the Transportation Data Coordinating Committee [TDCC], whose work later evolved into the ANSI X12|X12 standard began developing Electronic Data Interchange [EDI] standards primarily for transportation. From there, a variety of EDI implementations took root, including UCS. The original draft was designed by companies representing some of the industries noted earlier. By 1976 the design of an EDI standard was underway. It would take six years before the standard saw its first usage.

Scope
UCS supports both office-to-office (batch) and DSD, or "direct store delivery," transactions. The latter is an interactive method designed to replace paperwork by allowing systems ranging from small hand-held devices to large mainframe computers to be able to exchange delivery and return data.

External links
 (Uniform Communication Standard) home page

Data interchange standards